Kevin Thomas Campbell is a former New Zealand member of parliament for the Alliance, and the party's leader outside of Parliament at its deregistration in May 2015.

Early career
Campbell worked as a milkman, before becoming a police officer. He trained to be a Catholic priest at Holy Name Seminary and Holy Cross College. However he was not ordained. Prior to entering Parliament he qualified as a Barrister and Solicitor and practiced in criminal law.

Member of Parliament

Campbell was the Alliance candidate for the 1998 Taranaki-King Country by-election, and claimed to have "played some small part in bringing about the closer working relationship between Labour and the Alliance as a result of that by-election."

He was a member of the Alliance, having been elected to Parliament as a list MP in the 1999 election, where he stood in the  electorate and was placed tenth on the Alliance list.

In April 2002, the Alliance party split and Campbell did not appear on the list issued later that year, where his party lost representation due to not reaching the 5% vote threshold.

Since leaving Parliament Campbell has worked as a Supervising Solicitor at Community Law Canterbury. Campbell ran again as an Alliance candidate in the  electorate, seeking to be the replacement for out-going MP Jim Anderton but lost, coming fourth, to Megan Woods, a former member of the Alliance & Progressive parties standing on a Labour ticket.

As of the 2011 election Campbell returned to being an active participant in the Alliance Party and currently sits as the Co-leader of the Party.

References

Living people
Alliance (New Zealand political party) MPs
NewLabour Party (New Zealand) politicians
1949 births
New Zealand list MPs
Holy Name Seminary alumni
Holy Cross College, New Zealand alumni
Unsuccessful candidates in the 2011 New Zealand general election
Unsuccessful candidates in the 1996 New Zealand general election
Members of the New Zealand House of Representatives
21st-century New Zealand politicians